The Danzig Trilogy is series of novels and novellas by German author Günter Grass. The trilogy focuses on the interwar and wartime period in the Free City of Danzig (now Gdańsk, Poland).

The three books in the trilogy are:
The Tin Drum (Die Blechtrommel), published in 1959
Cat and Mouse (Katz und Maus), published in 1961
Dog Years (Hundejahre), published in 1963

 
Novel series